Argaam (Arabic: أرقام) is a Saudi Arabian financial news portal and considered as the primary source to media and public for financial news as it provides real-time updates on financial markets as well as market data and analysis, interviews, and coverage of stocks listed across the region. Argaam has won UAE App & Web Award and is operated by the Argaam Investment Company, which launched the Arabic version in March 2007 and an English variant in April 2015.

On October 18, 2017, The Saudi Research and Marketing Group (SRMG) has acquired a controlling stake in the Argaam Investment and Trading Company, which publishes an online financial news service. SRMG acquired 51 percent of Argaam for $10 million in an attempt to expand its operations, at a time when Saudi Arabia is diversifying its economy and opening up to more foreign investments and as a part of the National Transformation Plan (NTP) 2020 and Vision 2030.

Akhbaar24 
Akhbaar24 (Arabic: أخبار24) is an electronic newspaper specialized in covering the latest news of interest to Saudi Arabian and Arab audience 24 hours a day, whether local or foreign. The service also covers the most influential political news in the Middle East. Akhbaar24's website also features 24 a specialized vertical for the most prominent videos posted on social networking sites and the Internet that deal with Saudi affairs.

Website: https://akhbaar24.argaam.com

Alphabeta 
Alphabeta is a sub-division of Argaam that publishes field-related Gulf columnists' articles.

References 

News agencies based in Saudi Arabia
Financial news agencies